Apache is a genus of two distinctive North American species of true bugs in the family Derbidae.

Species
There are two species in the genus Apache:

 Apache californicum Wilkey, 1963
 Apache degeerii (Kirby, 1821)

References

Otiocerinae
Auchenorrhyncha genera